Ceremony for the 1st Hundred Flowers Awards was held in 1962, Beijing.

Awards

Best Film

Best Director

Best Screenplay

Best Actor

Best Actress

Best Supporting Actor

Best Animation

Best Chinese Opera Film

External links
China.com.cn

1962